Bremworth Limited (formerly Cavalier Corporation) is a New Zealand company specializing in the manufacture of broadloom wool carpet. Floated in 1984, the company was once included in the NZX 50 share index, as one of New Zealand's 50 largest public companies. It left the NZX50 due to a low market capitalisation in January 2013.

Formation
The company took over the assets of Bremworth Carpets, who had been manufacturing since 1959.

Group holdings
 100% ownership of Bremworth Carpets and Rugs Limited, which has representation across Australia and New Zealand as well as a carpet manufacturing plant in Auckland.
 100% ownership of Bremworth Spinners, which operates yarn spinning plants in Napier and Whanganui.
 100% ownership of Elco Direct Ltd., a wool procurement company.

References

External links
Official Website
Carpet Cleaning

Textile companies of New Zealand
Carpet manufacturing companies
Manufacturing companies based in Auckland
Companies listed on the New Zealand Exchange